General elections were held in Luxembourg on 26 May 1974. The Christian Social People's Party remained the largest party, winning 18 of the 59 seats in the Chamber of Deputies. However, it went into opposition as the Luxembourg Socialist Workers' Party and Democratic Party formed a coalition government under prime minister Gaston Thorn.

Results

References

Chamber of Deputies (Luxembourg) elections
Legislative election, 1974
Luxembourg
History of Luxembourg (1945–present)
May 1974 events in Europe